Zeuzera yuennani is a moth in the family Cossidae. It was described by Franz Daniel in 1940. It is found in China (Yunnan) and southern Vietnam.

References

Zeuzerinae
Moths described in 1940